Tom Schilling (born 10 February 1982) is a German film and television actor.

Life and acting career
Schilling grew up in the formerly East German borough of Berlin Mitte. He was discovered at the age of 12 by stage director Thomas Heise, and cast in the stage play Im Schlagschatten des Mondes (Under the shadow of the moon) at the Berliner Ensemble theatre company, which he stayed with for the next four years to play in other productions as well. Acting jobs earned him enough money to move out of his parents' place when he was 18 and still in school. He left school with an Abitur certificate.

Schilling's screen acting debut was in 1996, when he appeared in the Sat.1 TV series Hallo, Onkel Doc! at the age of 14. He was later cast in the theatrical film  (1999) where he played alongside Franka Potente, Daniel Brühl and Heiner Lauterbach, but the breakthrough for him came with his performance in Crazy (2000, directed by Hans-Christian Schmid), for which he received the Talented Young Actor Award of the Bayerischer Filmpreis.

In the critically well-received 2004 film Before the Fall (German title: Napola – Elite für den Führer, directed by Dennis Gansel) Schilling appeared alongside Max Riemelt as a young and fragile student at a Nazi elite school (Napola). In 2006, he received a scholarship for the Lee Strasberg Institute in New York, where he studied for half a year. 
In the same year, he became a father to a son. Schilling was later given the role of the young Adolf Hitler in Urs Odermatt's 2009 film Mein Kampf (the UK DVD release is marketed as Dawn of Evil: Rise of the Reich), co-starring Götz George.

Schilling originally wanted to become a painter and study art after school. In a 2008 interview he said he was not much of an extrovert, and that to him having to deliver oneself up on a day-to-day basis was a major disadvantage of being in the acting profession.

In the early summer of 2014 Schilling's second child, a son, was born - the first child for him and his partner, the assistant director Annie Mosebach. In January 2017, Schilling's first daughter and third child was born - the second child for him and Mosebach.

Filmography 
 1996: Hallo, Onkel Doc! (TV series), episode: Manege frei
 1998: Der heiße Genuss (short film)
 1999: Tatort (TV series), episode: Kinder der Gewalt
 1999: 
 2000: Crazy
 2000: Der Himmel kann warten
 2001: Tatort (TV series), episode: Tot bist Du!
 2001: 
 2002: Fetisch (short film)
 2002: Mehmet (short film)
 2002: Schlüsselkinder (short film)
 2002: Weil ich gut bin
 2002: Weichei (short film)
 2003:  (Verschwende deine Jugend)
 2004: Agnes and His Brothers (Agnes und seine Brüder)
 2004: Egoshooter
 2004: Kurz – Der Film
 2004: Before the Fall (Napola – Elite für den Führer)
 2005: Die letzte Schlacht
 2005: Tatort (TV series), episode: 
 2006: Einfache Leute
 2006: Atomised / The Elementary Particles (Elementarteilchen) 
 2006: Joy Division
 2006: Black Sheep
 2006: Wigald (short film)
 2007: Pornorama
 2007: KDD – Kriminaldauerdienst (TV series)
 2007: Neben der Spur
 2007: Why Men Don't Listen and Women Can't Read Maps (Warum Männer nicht zuhören und Frauen schlecht einparken)
 2008: Robert Zimmermann Is Tangled Up in Love (Robert Zimmermann wundert sich über die Liebe)
 2008: Tatort (TV crime series), episode: Der frühe Abschied
 2008: Mordgeständnis
 2008: The Baader Meinhof Complex (theatrical film, drama)
 2009: Dawn of Evil: Rise of the Reich (Mein Kampf), inspired by a stage play by George Tabori  
 2009: Bloch (TV series), episode: Tod eines Freundes
 2009:  (German/Italian TV film based on Ken Follett's novel Whiteout)
 2010: Tatort (TV series), episode: Am Ende des Tages
 2010: Ich, Ringo und das Tor zur Welt (TV biopic)
 2011: Polizeiruf 110 (TV series), episode: Die verlorene Tochter
 2011: Tatort (TV series), episode: Auskreuzung
 2012: A Coffee in Berlin (theatrical film, comedy/drama)
 2012: Ludwig II. (theatrical film, period drama)
 2013:  (TV mini-series)
 2013:  (theatrical film, comedy)
 2013: Unsere Mütter, unsere Väter (TV mini-series) Also broadcast on BBC 2(UK) in April/May 2014 as Generation War.
 2014: Who Am I – No System is Safe
 2014: Posthumous
 2014: Suite Francaise
 2015: Woman in Gold
 2015:  (Tod den Hippies!! Es lebe der Punk)
 2016:  (TV film)
 2016: NSU German History X
 2017: The Same Sky (TV Series), 6 episodes on Netflix
 2018: Never Look Away
 2019: Lara
 2019: The Goldfish (Die Goldfische)
 2019: Brecht
 2021: Fabian – Going to the Dogs

Audio plays 
 2003: Die Meute der Mórrígan (The Hounds of the Morrigan) – role: Pidge
 2003: Das Geheimnis der verborgenen Insel (Monster Mission)
 2003: Hanni und Nanni und ihre Gäste (based on Enid Blyton's book series St. Clare's) – role: Peter
 2008: Jodi Picoult: Neunzehn Minuten (Nineteen Minutes) – role: Peter Houghton (audiobook), publisher: der Hörverlag, 
 2011: Übernacht – role: Jan
 2012: Als ich meine Eltern verließ – audiobook recording of the novel by Michel Rostain (orig. French title: Le Fils)

Awards 
 2000: Bavarian Film Awards, Germany: Young Talented Actor award for his performance in Crazy
 2005: Undine Awards, Germany: Best young character actor award (Bester jugendlicher Charakterdarsteller) for his performance in Before the Fall
 2005: Undine Awards, Germany: Audience award (Zuschauerpreis) for his performance in Before the Fall
 2008: Wiesbaden Fernsehkrimi-Festival: Deutscher Fernsehkrimipreis (German crime fiction TV award) special award for outstanding performance in Tatort – Der frühe Abschied 
 2012: Oldenburg International Film Festival: Seymour Cassel Award for his performance in Oh Boy 
 2013: Bavarian Film Awards, Germany: Best male actor award (Bester Darsteller) for his performance in Oh Boy 
 2013: German Film Awards (Goldene Lola): Best male actor in a leading role (for his performance in Oh Boy)

References

External links
 

Living people
1982 births
21st-century German male actors
German male film actors
German male television actors
German male child actors
German male stage actors
Lee Strasberg Theatre and Film Institute alumni
Male actors from Berlin
German Film Award winners